The 2000 MBNA.com 400 was the 27th stock car race of the 2000 NASCAR Winston Cup Series and the 32nd iteration of the event. The race was held on Sunday, September 24, 2000, in Dover, Delaware at Dover International Speedway, a 1-mile (1.6 km) permanent oval-shaped racetrack. The race took the scheduled 400 laps to complete. At race's end, Joe Gibbs Racing driver Tony Stewart would manage to dominate the late stages of the race to take his seventh career NASCAR Winston Cup Series victory and his fourth victory of the season. To fill out the top three, MB2 Motorsports driver Johnny Benson Jr. and Robert Yates Racing driver Ricky Rudd would finish second and third, respectively.

Background 

Dover International Speedway is an oval race track in Dover, Delaware, United States that has held at least two NASCAR races since it opened in 1969. In addition to NASCAR, the track also hosted USAC and the NTT IndyCar Series. The track features one layout, a 1-mile (1.6 km) concrete oval, with 24° banking in the turns and 9° banking on the straights. The speedway is owned and operated by Dover Motorsports.

The track, nicknamed "The Monster Mile", was built in 1969 by Melvin Joseph of Melvin L. Joseph Construction Company, Inc., with an asphalt surface, but was replaced with concrete in 1995. Six years later in 2001, the track's capacity moved to 135,000 seats, making the track have the largest capacity of sports venue in the mid-Atlantic. In 2002, the name changed to Dover International Speedway from Dover Downs International Speedway after Dover Downs Gaming and Entertainment split, making Dover Motorsports. From 2007 to 2009, the speedway worked on an improvement project called "The Monster Makeover", which expanded facilities at the track and beautified the track. After the 2014 season, the track's capacity was reduced to 95,500 seats.

Entry list 

 (R) denotes rookie driver.

Practice 
Originally, three practice sessions were scheduled to be held, with one on Friday and two on Saturday. However, due to rain, the first Saturday session was cancelled.

First practice 
The first practice session was held on Friday, September 22, at 10:00 AM EST. The session would last for two hours.

Final practice 
The final practice session, sometimes referred to as Happy Hour, was held on Saturday, September 23, after the preliminary 2000 MBNA.com 200 NASCAR Busch Series race. The session would last for one hour.

Qualifying 
Qualifying was originally scheduled to be split into two rounds. First-round qualifying was ran on Friday, September 22m at 1:30 PM EST. Each driver would have one lap to set at time. Originally, the first round would lock in the top 25 drivers into the field. Second-round qualifying was scheduled to set the rest of the field; however, rain would force the cancellation of the second round, leading the field to be set by qualifying results from the first round. Positions 26-36 would be decided on time, while positions 37-43 would be based on provisionals. Six spots are awarded by the use of provisionals based on owner's points. The seventh is awarded to a past champion who has not otherwise qualified for the race. If no past champion needs the provisional, the next team in the owner points will be awarded a provisional.

Two drivers would fail to qualify.

Full qualifying results

Race results

References 

2000 NASCAR Winston Cup Series
NASCAR races at Dover Motor Speedway
September 2000 sports events in the United States
2000 in sports in Delaware